List of beaches in Oregon enumerates all landmarks designated as a beach in the U.S. state of Oregon.

Not listed above:
 Gold Beach
 Manzanita Beach
 Seaside Beach, Seaside
 Oceanside
 Tunnel Beach
 Oceanside Beach State Park
 Hubbard Creek Beach
 Newport
 South Beach State Park
Depoe Bay
 Depoe Bay Beach
 Whale Cove National Wildlife Refuge
Lincoln City
 Nelscott Beach
 Lincoln City Beach
Rockaway Beach
 Manhattan Beach State Recreation Site
 Diamond Beach
 Nadonna Beach
Yachats
 Yachats Ocean Road State Natural Site
 Cape Cove Beach (Cape Perpetua)

See also 
 List of beaches
 List of shoals of Oregon
 Lists of Oregon-related topics
 List of beaches in the United States

Beaches
 
Oregon
Pacific Ocean-related lists